Shonte is a given name. Notable people with the name include:

 Shonte Peoples (born 1972), Canadian footballer
 Shonte Seale (born 1999), Barbadian netball player

See also
 Shontz